Androsace sarmentosa, the rock jasmine, is a perennial plant in the family Primulaceae, native to the Himalayas and Tibet. As its synonym Androsace studiosorum it has gained the Royal Horticultural Society's Award of Garden Merit.

Description

It forms deep-green evergreen compact rosettes of elliptic-oblanceolate leaves,  in width, covered with short white hairs. It blooms from June to August.

Distribution and habitat
Androsace sarmentosa is native to the Himalayas, including Nepal, and Tibet.

References

Biolib
Luirig.altervista
Plants for a future
Alpine Plant Encyclopaedia

sarmentosa
Flora of East Himalaya
Flora of Nepal
Flora of Tibet
Flora of West Himalaya